Mercury telluride (HgTe) is a binary chemical compound of mercury and tellurium. It is a semi-metal related to the II-VI group of semiconductor materials. Alternative names are mercuric telluride and mercury(II) telluride.

HgTe occurs in nature as the mineral form coloradoite.

Physical properties
All properties are at standard temperature and pressure unless stated otherwise. The lattice parameter is about 0.646 nm in the cubic crystalline form. The bulk modulus is about 42.1 GPa. The thermal expansion coefficient is about 5.2×10−6/K. Static dielectric constant 20.8, dynamic dielectric constant 15.1. Thermal conductivity is low at 2.7 W·m2/(m·K). HgTe bonds are weak leading to low hardness values. Hardness 2.7×107 kg/m2.

Doping
N-type doping can be achieved with elements such as boron, aluminium, gallium, or indium. Iodine and iron will also dope n-type. HgTe is naturally p-type due to mercury vacancies. P-type doping is also achieved by introducing zinc, copper, silver, or gold.

Topological insulation

Mercury telluride was the first topological insulator discovered, in 2007.  Topological insulators cannot support an electric current in the bulk, but electronic states confined to the surface can serve as charge carriers.

Chemistry 
HgTe bonds are weak. Their enthalpy of formation, around −32kJ/mol, is less than a third of the value for the related compound cadmium telluride. HgTe is easily etched by acids, such as hydrobromic acid.

Growth
Bulk growth is from a mercury and tellurium melt in the presence of a high mercury vapour pressure. HgTe can also be grown epitaxially, for example, by sputtering or by metalorganic vapour phase epitaxy.

Nanoparticles of mercury telluride can be obtained via cation exchange from cadmium telluride nanoplatelets.

See also
 Cadmium telluride
 Mercury selenide
 Mercury cadmium telluride

References

External links
 Thermophysical properties database at Germany's Chemistry Information Centre, Berlin

Mercury(II) compounds
Tellurides
II-VI semiconductors
Zincblende crystal structure